Gwara (iGwara) is a newly discovered Plateau language of Nigeria. It was first reported by Roger Blench in 2009. There are marked similarities with the related language Idun, but some of these may be due to borrowing.

References

Central Plateau languages
Languages of Nigeria